Olešník is a municipality and village in České Budějovice District in the South Bohemian Region of the Czech Republic. It has about 800 inhabitants.

Administrative parts
Villages of Chlumec and Nová Ves are administrative parts of Olešník.

References

Villages in České Budějovice District